Tumangang-rodongjagu is a neighbourhood in Sonbong, Rason, North Korea, near the China–North Korea–Russia tripoint where the borders of the three countries converge. It is also the closest town in North Korea to the border with Russia, being located across the river from the Russian settlement of Khasan and the Chinese settlement of Fangchuancun. Trains coming from and going to Russia are handled by Tumangang Station.

Rason
Neighbourhoods in North Korea
Korea–Soviet Union relations
North Korea–Russia border crossings